Divorce His, Divorce Hers is a 1973 British/American made-for-television drama film starring Elizabeth Taylor and Richard Burton. The film examines the conflicted emotions felt by a couple whose 18-year marriage has frayed beyond repair.  The first half of the film (Divorce His) details the story from the husband's perspective, and the second half (Divorce Hers) takes the wife's perspective. It is the final film to star both Burton and Taylor together.

The film, which was directed by Waris Hussein, from a script by John Hopkins, was originally presented in a two-part broadcast on U.S. television on February 6–7, 1973 (appearing on the Tuesday and Wednesday editions of the ABC Movie of the Week), although it was theatrically released in France in 1974. The critic Clive James wrote after the television screening in Britain (June 24 and 25,1973): "After movies as monumentally lousy as Bluebeard and Hammersmith is Out it was good to see Burton chipping some of the rust off his technique."

Cast 
 Richard Burton: Martin Reynolds
 Elizabeth Taylor: Jane Reynolds
 Carrie Nye: Diana Proctor
 Barry Foster: Donald Trenton, Martin's Partner
 Gabriele Ferzetti: Turi Livicci
 Ronald Radd: Angus McIntyre
 Thomas Baptiste: Minister
 Mark Colleano: Tommy Reynolds
 Rosalyn Landor: Peggy Reynolds
 Daniela Surina: Franca
 Rudolph Walker: Kaduna
 Eva Griffith: Judith Reynolds

References

External links 

1973 television films
1973 films
1973 drama films
Films directed by Waris Hussein
Films with screenplays by John Hopkins
Films scored by Stanley Myers
ABC Movie of the Week
American drama television films
1970s American films